Truccazzano (Lombard: Truccazzan [trykaˈsãː]) is a comune (municipality) in the Province of Milan in the Italian region Lombardy, located about  east of Milan.

References

External links
 temi.provincia.mi.it/comuni/truccazzano/

Cities and towns in Lombardy